The Yuma Open was a golf tournament that ran from 1990 to 1993 on the Nike Tour It was played at Desert Hills Golf Course in Yuma, Arizona.

Winners

Bolded golfers graduated to the PGA Tour via the final Nike Tour money list.

References

Former Korn Ferry Tour events
Golf in Arizona
Yuma, Arizona
Recurring sporting events established in 1990
Recurring sporting events disestablished in 1993
1990 establishments in Arizona
1993 disestablishments in Arizona